Tauroscopa gorgopis is a moth in the family Crambidae. It was described by Edward Meyrick in 1888. This species is endemic to New Zealand.

The wingspan is about 23 mm. The forewings are fuscous black with some brown scales and white lines. The hindwings are fuscous.

References

Crambinae
Moths described in 1888
Moths of New Zealand
Endemic fauna of New Zealand
Taxa named by Edward Meyrick
Endemic moths of New Zealand